Kennedy Lake is the largest lake on Vancouver Island, British Columbia, Canada.  Located north of Ucluelet on the island's central west coast, the lake is formed chiefly by the confluence of the Clayoquot and Kennedy Rivers.  Outflow is via a short stretch of the Kennedy River into Tofino Inlet.  The lake includes an extensive northern arm called Clayoquot Arm.

The lake and surrounding region's natural beauty has led to portions of it being protected from the logging industry.  Parks adjacent to the lake include Clayoquot Plateau Provincial Park, Pacific Rim National Park, Clayoquot Arm Provincial Park, Kennedy Lake Provincial Park, Kennedy River Bog Provincial Park and the Clayoquot Arm Beach recreation site.  The lake is a popular recreation destination for camping, boating and fishing.  It is an important spawning habitat for sockeye and various species of salmon and trout, and lies within the Coastal Western Hemlock Biogeoclimatic Zone.

The lake is part of the ancestral lands of the Tla-o-qui-aht First Nations, and is named for the last governor of the Colony of Vancouver Island, Sir Arthur Kennedy.

Geography  
It has an irregular shape made up of two basins, referred to as the Main Arm and the Clayoquot Arm, connected by a narrow sill.

British Columbia Highway 4 winds along the south-east and southern side of the lake, the only highway accessing the communities of Ucluelet and Tofino.

See also
 Clayoquot Sound

References

External links
 Kennedy Lake Provincial Park.
 Kennedy River Bog Provincial Park.
 Clayoquot Arm Provincial Park.
 Clayoquot Plateau Provincial Park.
 

Barkley Sound region
Clayoquot Sound region
Lakes of Vancouver Island
Clayoquot Land District